Wake is a 2003 American drama film directed by Henry LeRoy Finch, starring Gale Harold, Dihlon McManne, Blake Gibbons and John Winthrop Philbrick.

Cast
 Gale Harold as Kyle Riven
 Dihlon McManne as Sebastien Riven
 Martin Landau as Older Sebastien Riven
 Blake Gibbons as Raymond Riven
 John Winthrop Philbrick as Jack Riven
 Muriel Kenderdine as Mother
 Dusty Paik as April
 Rainer Judd as Dusty

Release
The film opened on 28 May 2004.

Reception
Maitland McDonagh of the TV Guide rated the film 3 stars out of 5 and wrote, "Its assets include uniformly strong performances; Gibbons and Harold revel in the showy roles, and get strong support from McManne and Philbrick. Even Paik and Judd invest their one-note roles with surprising vividness. Shooting on digital video, cinematographer Patrick Kelly delivers a vibrantly smeary look that evokes alternately sordid and surreally beautiful flashes of poisonously intoxicated memory." Ronnie Scheib of Variety wrote that "Strong thesping and solid staging, atmospherically accompanied by disorienting, darkly folksy Ramsay Midwood songs make “Wake” surprisingly watchable for a film whose whole raison d’etre appears to be something of a mystery."

Noel Murray of The A.V. Club wrote that the film "looks great and sounds great—apart from what the people in it do and say." Dave Kehr of The New York Times wrote that the film was "instantly forgettable". Chuck Wilson of LA Weekly wrote that "one feels sympathy for the ensemble, which, absent full-bodied characters to inhabit, mug furiously, as if big gestures conjure big themes." Ben Kenigsberg of The Village Voice wrote a negative review of the film.

References

External links
 
 

American drama films
2004 drama films